The Haddas River (alt. Hadas River) is a seasonal river in Eritrea. Outside of the small town of Foro in the central part of the nation, the watercourse merges with the Comaile and Aligide rivers. The combined river flows south of Massawa, emptying into the Red Sea. Silt carried down in the river has led to the burial of the ancient town of Adulis.

Hadas river is the origin Adi keyih round and combine with Alighede river in wea that means in saho language flooding.
It is also in the time of elf have a big role to defeat enemy.because transport is be easy to connect massawa and Adi keyih

See also
List of rivers of Eritrea

References

Rivers of Eritrea